In anatomy, a joint capsule or articular capsule is an envelope surrounding a synovial joint. Each joint capsule has two parts: an outer fibrous layer or membrane, and an inner synovial layer or membrane.

Membranes
Each capsule consists of two layers or membranes:
 an outer (fibrous membrane, fibrous stratum) composed of avascular white fibrous tissue
 an inner (synovial membrane, synovial stratum) which is a secreting layer

On the inside of the capsule, articular cartilage covers the end surfaces of the bones that articulate within that joint.

The outer layer is highly innervated by the same nerves which perforate through the adjacent muscles associated with the joint.

Fibrous membrane
The fibrous membrane of the joint capsule is attached to the whole circumference of the articular end of each bone entering into the joint, and thus entirely surrounds the articulation.  It is made up of dense connective tissue. It's a long spongy tissue.

Clinical significance
Frozen shoulder (adhesive capsulitis) is a disorder in which the shoulder capsule becomes inflamed.

Plica syndrome is a disorder in which the synovial plica becomes inflamed and causes abnormal biomechanics in the knee.

Gallery

See also
 Articular capsule of the humerus
 Articular capsule of the knee joint
 Atlanto-axial joint
 Capsule of atlantooccipital articulation
 Capsule of hip joint
 Capsule of temporomandibular joint

References

External links
 

Anatomy